Torquil is an Anglicised form of the Norwegian and Swedish masculine name Torkel, and the Scottish Gaelic name Torcall. The Scottish Gaelic name Torcall is a Gaelicised form of the Old Norse name Þorkell. The Scandinavian Torkel is a contracted form of the Old Norse Þorkell, made up of the two elements: Þór, meaning "Thor" the Norse god of thunder; and kell (in some variants ketill), meaning "(sacrificial) cauldron".

A variant spelling of the Scottish Gaelic Torcall is Torcull. A similar Scottish Gaelic given name is Torcadall, which is also Anglicised as Torquil.

Torquil
Torquil (priest), Archdeacon of Dublin in 1180
Torquil Campbell, (born 1972), co-lead singer and songwriter of the Canadian band Stars
Torquil MacLeod, 14th century Scottish clan chief
Torquil MacLeod (clan chief), 16th-century Scottish clan chief
Torquil MacNeill, 16th century Scottish clan chief
Torquil Neilson, Australian actor
Torquil Norman (born 1933), English businessman
Torquil Riley-Smith (born 1962), founder of LBH, Britain's first gay radio station

Torquhil
Torquhil Campbell, 13th Duke of Argyll, (born 1968), a Scottish peer
Torquhil Matheson, (1871–1963), a senior British Army officer of the First World War

See also
Mac Torcaill

References

English-language masculine given names
Scandinavian Scotland
Scottish masculine given names